Puerto Rican rapper and singer Bad Bunny has won three Grammy Awards, nine Latin Grammy Awards, eight Billboard Music Awards, an MTV Video Music Award, two American Music Awards, thirteen Premios Lo Nuestro, among other accolades. He has received nine Grammy Award nominations: Record of the Year for "I Like It" in 2019, Best Latin Rock, Urban or Alternative Album for both X 100pre and Oasis in 2020, Best Latin Pop or Urban Album for YHLQMDLG in 2021 and El Último Tour del Mundo in 2022, Best Pop Duo/Group Performance for "Un Día (One Day)" in 2021. In 2020, he received the ASCAP Latin award for Songwriter of the Year. Awarded 4 iHeartRadio Music Awards along with the accomplishment of reaching 1 Billion Total Audience Spins for “I Like It” w/ Cardi B & J Balvin.  In 2021, he won a professional wrestling championship, when he became the WWE 24/7 Champion. On  February 15, 2021, episode of RAW, he relinquished the title to R-Truth in exchange for Stone Cold Steve Austin memorabilia. He was champion for 28 days.

Awards and nominations

References

External links
 

Bad Bunny